An eighth referendum on the Compact of Free Association was held in Palau on 9 November 1993, after the previous seven referendums had failed to achieve the 75% in favour necessary.  Voters were asked whether they approved of the Compact of Free Association between Palau and the United States signed on 10 January 1986. It was approved by 68.4% of voters, with a turnout of 64.4%. This time the referendum was passed, due to the constitutional amendment approved in a referendum the previous year that had lowered the threshold to a 50% majority.

Results

References

Palau
1993 in Palau
Referendums in Palau